An izaar, also izar or ʾizār, also known as futah,, wizarah,  maqtab is a clothing worn as a lower garment typically worn by men in Yemen, UAE, Iraq, Kuwait, Bahrain, Saudi Arabia and Qatar, and the Horn of Africa (Somalia, Djibouti, Ethiopia and Eritrea). Omani people typically wear a white izaar underneath the Thawb instead of sirwar pyjamas. Izaar-like clothing is also worn in countries such as Indonesia, Malaysia, Bangladesh, Pakistan and countries in some parts of East Africa and in India. It is commonly worn by Yemenis at home, and work. In some parts of Arabia such as Yemen and the Jizan and ʿAsir regions of Saudi Arabia, it is known as futah instead. It is also worn in the city of Aqaba. Some of these may feature tassels.

Similar garments
The izaar may be considered synonymous with the lungi in the Indian subcontinent and with the macawiis in the Horn of Africa. It may also be considered a type of sarong (spelt saroun  in Arabic).

It is similar to a kilt, except it is lighter and thinner. It is usually striped or patterned with bold colours (often with rectangular shapes), but it can also be found plain. An izaar is usually folded around the lower body, then wrapped tightly around the waist.

See also
 Sarong
 Shendyt
 Thawb

References

Arabic clothing
History of Asian clothing